The Burke County World War Memorial Hall in Flaxton in Burke County, North Dakota was listed on the National Register of Historic Places in 2018.

It is also known as Flaxton Memorial Hall.  It was designed by C.A. Pear.

References

National Register of Historic Places in West Virginia
Neoclassical architecture in West Virginia
Buildings and structures completed in 1928
McDowell County, West Virginia